This is a round-up of the 2005 Sligo Senior Football Championship. The year saw Coolera, who had suffered two final defeats earlier in the decade, end their long wait for Championship glory, stretching back to 1907. They defeated Curry in the final, who had disposed of the holders Tourlestrane after a semi-final replay. No team was relegated in 2005, in order to bring the number of competing teams up to 16 in 2006.

Group stages

The Championship was contested by 15 teams, divided into three groups of four, and one of three. The top two sides in each group advanced to the quarter-finals.

Group A

Group B

Group C

Group D

Playoffs

Only one group required a playoff. In Group A Calry/St. Joseph's, Bunninadden and Tubbercurry all finished level on points, with Calry/St. Joseph's gaining top spot on scoring difference. Bunninadden and Tubbercurry met in the playoff, and it was Tubber who were victorious, as they had been in the earlier group meeting. This was the fifth year in succession that Bunninadden had not reached the knockout stages, going back to their 2000 title victory.

Quarterfinals

The quarter finals of the Championship saw the exit of Calry/St. Joseph's, Tubbercurry, Easkey and Drumcliffe/Rosses Point. Curry, Coolera/Strandhill, Tourlestrane and Eastern Harps qualified for the semi-finals. The Tourlestrane/Easkey proved a bizarre affair, with Easkey failing to score for over forty minutes. By then Tourlestrane had racked up 2–10 and were preparing for the semi-finals.

Semifinals

The semi-finals saw the defeat of reigning champions Tourlestrane, beaten by rivals Curry after a replay. In the other Semi-Final Coolera/Strandhill withstood a late Eastern Harps rally to claim their place in the final.

Last eight

Sligo Senior Football Championship Final

References
 Sligo Champion (Summer/Autumn 2005)
 Sligo Weekender (Summer/Autumn 2005)
 Western People (September 2005)

Sligo Senior Football Championship
Sligo Senior Football Championship